Alexandra Leah Murrel (born January 29, 1987) is an American singer and actress. She rose to stardom in the hit MTV reality show Laguna Beach: The Real Orange County as the tough, carefree character on the show. She's now focused on her music career and has just signed to Warner Bros. Records and has released singles such as "What's It To You", "Best Friend", and "Hello", which has been featured on Laguna Beach: The Real Orange County. Now she studies at Chapman University.

Music career
Murrel grew up in a very musical family. In high school she was in drama club and chorus. Her first single "Hello" hit Laguna Beach radios and was featured on Laguna Beach: The Real Orange County. She performed the song at the Fight the Slide Benefit Auction. Her second single, "Best Friend", was only released once on the radio and is downloadable on iTunes. Her new songs "Now" and "What's It To You" were only released on Alex's Myspace page. Her debut album will be released this summer. Alex's song "Let It Come True" was featured in the 2009 movie American High School.

Label drop
In early January 2009 Alex left her label due to company differences.

Acting career
Alex made her acting debut in the comedy film American High School as Dixie, co-starring Laguna Beach co-star Talan Torriero and singer Aubrey O'Day.

Filmography
2005: Laguna Beach: The Real Orange County
2006: The Guardians
2009: American High School
2009: Action News 5

References

External links

Alex Murrel's Myspace
Alex Murrel's Fansite On Bebo

American socialites
American actresses
1987 births
Living people
21st-century American singers
21st-century American women singers
21st-century American actresses
People from Laguna Beach, California